Saint-Zénon is a municipality in the Lanaudière region of Quebec, part of the Matawinie Regional County Municipality.

Demographics

Population
In the 2021 Census, Statistics Canada reported that Saint-Zénon had a population of 1,317 living in 721 of its 1,357 total dwellings, an 17.6% change from its 2016 population of 1,120.

Language
Mother tongue:
 English as first language: 1.5%
 French as first language: 94.3%
 English and French as first language: 0.8%
 Other as first language: 2.7%

Education

Commission scolaire des Samares operates francophone public schools:
 École Bérard

The Sir Wilfrid Laurier School Board operates anglophone public schools serving the community at the secondary level, including:
 Joliette High School in Joliette

See also
List of municipalities in Quebec

References

Incorporated places in Lanaudière
Municipalities in Quebec
Matawinie Regional County Municipality